Gastrochaenidae is a taxonomic family of saltwater clams, marine bivalve molluscs in the order Gastrochaenida.

Genera
Genera within the family Gastrochaenidae include:
Cucurbitula Gould, 1861
Dufoichaena Jousseaume in Lamy, 1925
Eufistulana Eames, 1951
Gastrochaena Spengler, 1783
Lamychaena Freneix, 1979
Rocellaria Blainville, 1828
Spengleria Tryon, 1861
Spenglerichaena Carter, 2011

References

Further reading
 Powell A. W. B., New Zealand Mollusca, William Collins Publishers Ltd, Auckland, New Zealand 1979 

 
Bivalve families
Taxa named by John Edward Gray